Veterinary oncology is a subspecialty of veterinary medicine that deals with cancer diagnosis and treatment in animals. Cancer is a major cause of death in pet animals. In one study, 45% of the dogs that reached 10 years of age or older died of cancer.

Skin tumors are the most frequently diagnosed type of tumor in domestic animals for two reasons: 1. constant exposure of animal skin to the sun and external environment, 2. skin tumors are easy to see because they are on the outside of the animal.

Cancer statistics

Male dogs

Female dogs

These statistics, being from the 1960s, may not be an accurate representation of cancer in dogs currently.

Human-animal cancer connections

Companion animals such as dogs and cats suffer from many of the same types of cancer as humans. Cancer research with dogs has helped in the design of clinical trials for cancer therapy for humans. In the spirit of the One Health movement (global collaborative research on human and animal health) such human-animal connections in cancer research could benefit both humans and animals with cancer in the future.

Animals with cancer also sometimes function as animal sentinels that provide an early warning of carcinogens and an environmental health hazard to humans.

Ethical issues

Veterinarians use the HHHHHMM Scale to discuss animal quality of life with pet owners before a euthanasia decision is made for a pet with an incurable disease such as cancer (the letters stand for Hurt Hunger Hydration Hygiene Happiness Mobility and "More good days than bad days").

References

See also

Skin cancer in cats and dogs
Bladder cancer in cats and dogs
Bone cancer in cats and dogs
Intestinal cancer in cats and dogs
Nose cancer in cats and dogs
Stomach cancer in cats and dogs
Soft tissue sarcoma in cats and dogs
Lymphoma in animals
Feline leukemia
List of cancers in dogs
Oncology
Veterinary Medicine
Cancer in dogs
Cancer in cats

 
Oncology